Aster Società Italiana Motori was an Italian manufacturer of automobiles from 1906 to 1908. It was founded by the French manufacturer of Aster cars and engines, Ateliers de Construction Mecanique l'Aster.

History
The company based in Milan, began in 1906 with the sales of the French parents engines and subsequently built small numbers of Aster automobiles under license. In 1908 the company was dissolved.

Vehicle
The only model had a 2300cc six cylinder engine that developed 30 hp.

See also 

List of Italian companies

Bibliography
 Harald Linz and Halwart Schrader: The International Automobile Encyclopedia. United Soft Media Verlag GmbH, München 2008, 
 Autorenkollektiv: Enzyklopädie des Automobils. Models, Brands and Technology.  Weltbild Verlag, Augsburg, 1989

References

Defunct motor vehicle manufacturers of Italy
Milan motor companies
Auto parts suppliers of Italy